Prosopocera cylindrica is a species of beetle in the family Cerambycidae. It was described by Per Olof Christopher Aurivillius in 1903. It is known from the Democratic Republic of the Congo and Cameroon.

References

Prosopocerini
Beetles described in 1903